Velika Popina is a village in Croatia. The settlement is administered as a part of Gračac municipality,  Zadar County.

Population/Demographics

According to national census of 2011, population of the settlement is 71. The majority of the population are Serbs. This represents 20.17% of its pre-war population according to the 1991 census.

The 1991 census recorded that 95.17% of the village population were ethnic Serbs (335/352), 0.28% were Yugoslavs (1/352) while 4.55% were of other ethnic origin (16/352).

References

Populated places in Zadar County
Serb communities in Croatia